The 1992 United States Senate election in Alabama took place on November 3, 1992, alongside other elections to the United States Senate in other states as well as elections to the United States House of Representatives and various state and local elections. Incumbent Democratic U.S. Senator Richard Shelby won re-election to a second term in a landslide, winning every county except Shelby.

This was the last time a Democrat was elected to the United States Senate in Alabama until Doug Jones won in 2017 special election. As to date, this remains the last time a Democrat has won the Class 3 Senate seat in Alabama; Shelby has switched to the Republican Party in 1994 and continue to serve as a Republican until 2023. Despite Bill Clinton's failure to win the state on the presidential level, Shelby easily won re-election to a second term.

Candidates

Democratic
 Richard Shelby, incumbent U.S. Senator since 1987

Republican
 Richard Sellers, conservative activist

Results

See also
 1992 United States Senate elections
 1996 United States Senate election in Alabama

References

1992 Alabama elections
Alabama
1992